The 1972–73 Minnesota Fighting Saints season was their first season of operation in the newly created World Hockey Association (WHA).

Offseason

Regular season

Final standings

Game log

Playoffs
The Oilers and the Minnesota Fighting Saints were tied at the end of the season. They had the same number of victories and points, and they had both won four games against each other. Subsequently, it was decided that the two teams would play a one game playoff to decide the final spot in the playoffs, to be played in Calgary.

Winnipeg Jets 4, Minnesota Fighting Saints 1

Player stats

Note: Pos = Position; GP = Games played; G = Goals; A = Assists; Pts = Points; +/- = plus/minus; PIM = Penalty minutes; PPG = Power-play goals; SHG = Short-handed goals; GWG = Game-winning goals
      MIN = Minutes played; W = Wins; L = Losses; T = Ties; GA = Goals-against; GAA = Goals-against average; SO = Shutouts;

Awards and records

Transactions

Draft picks

Farm teams

See also
1972–73 WHA season

References

External links

Minnesota Fighting Saints seasons
Minn
Minn